Simon David R. Camacho (born 1995/1996) is a Filipino professional basketball player for the Phoenix Super LPG Fuel Masters of the Philippine Basketball Association (PBA). He played college basketball for the Adamson Soaring Falcons of the University Athletic Association of the Philippines (UAAP). He plays at the power forward position.

College career
A UAAP 82 team captain, Camacho was a known shot blocker for Adamson Soaring Falcons especially in his three straight Final Four appearances under coach Franz Pumaren from 2016 to 2018.

Professional career
Camacho played for the Bacolod Master Sardines of the Maharlika Pilipinas Basketball League (MPBL) from 2019 to 2020.

He played for Medical Depot of the amateur Filbasket and won Most Valuable Player. After his stint with Medical Depot, on November 26, 2021, he signed with the Phoenix Super LPG Fuel Masters of the Philippine Basketball Association (PBA), reuniting with college teammate Sean Manganti.

PBA career statistics

As of the end of 2021 season

Season-by-season averages

|-
| align=left | 
| align=left | Phoenix
| 8 || 6.8 || .615 || – || .500 || 1.8 || .4 || .3 || .4 || 2.1
|-class=sortbottom
| align="center" colspan=2 | Career
| 8 || 6.8 || .615 || – || .500 || 1.8 || .4 || .3 || .4 || 2.1

References

Year of birth uncertain
1990s births
Living people
Adamson Soaring Falcons basketball players
Basketball players from Cavite
Filipino men's basketball players
Maharlika Pilipinas Basketball League players
Phoenix Super LPG Fuel Masters players
Small forwards
TNT Tropang Giga draft picks
Filipino men's 3x3 basketball players
PBA 3x3 players